The 2021 IAAF World Indoor Tour was the sixth edition of the World Athletics Indoor Tour, the highest series of international track and field indoor meetings.

The tour expanded in 2021 with the introduction of three tiers of competition – Gold, Silver and Bronze – comprising 26 meetings in Europe and North America. and retains six gold standard events for 2021, five in Europe and one in the United States.

Meetings

Results

Men's track

Men's field

Women's track

Women's field

References

World Athletics Indoor Tour
Indoor World Tour